An annular solar eclipse occurred on March 17, 1904, also known as the "1904 St. Patrick's Day eclipse". A solar eclipse occurs when the Moon passes between Earth and the Sun, thereby totally or partly obscuring the image of the Sun for a viewer on Earth. An annular solar eclipse occurs when the Moon's apparent diameter is smaller than the Sun's, blocking most of the Sun's light and causing the Sun to look like an annulus (ring). An annular eclipse appears as a partial eclipse over a region of the Earth thousands of kilometres wide.

Related eclipses

Solar eclipses 1902–1907

Saros 128

Tritos series

Notes

References

 Russia expedition for solar eclipse of March 17, 1904

1904 3 17
1904 in science
1904 03 17
March 1904 events